Perils of Nyoka is a 1942 Republic serial directed by William Witney. It stars Kay Aldridge as Nyoka the Jungle Girl, a character who first appeared in the Edgar Rice Burroughs-inspired serial Jungle Girl.

Plot
Nyoka, with help from Larry Grayson, attempts to discover the golden tablets of Hippocrates. The tablets contain the medical knowledge of the ancients and are being buried along with gold and other treasure. Also hunting for the tablets are Queen Vultura (Ruler of the Arabs) and Cassib.

Cast

Main cast
Kay Aldridge as Nyoka Gordon. Aldridge replaced Frances Gifford. The success and popularity that Aldridge gained from the role made her the star of several other Republic serials. In his autobiography, director William Witney stated that the studio used a different actress to ensure that there would be no actionable copyright infringement. However, Ray Stedman writes that Gifford was not cast in Perils of Nyoka because she was on loan from another studio for Jungle Girl and was not available. William Cline partially backs this point of view, saying that Gifford was unavailable to reprise her role because she had moved on to feature films.
Clayton Moore as Dr. Larry Grayson
Lorna Gray as Vultura, Ruler of the Arabs
Charles Middleton as Cassib
William Benedict as Red Davis
Forbes Murray as Prof Douglas Campbell
George Pembroke as John Spencer
Tristram Coffin as Benito Torrini
Forrest Taylor as Translator

Supporting cast
Forbes Murray as Professor Douglas Campbell
Robert Strange as Professor Henry Gordon
George Pembroke as John Spencer
Georges Renavent as Maghreb, Vultura's high priest
John Davidson as Lhoba, Tuareg high priest
George J. Lewis as Batan, Arab henchman
Ken Terrell as Ahmed, Arab henchman
John Bagni as Ben Ali
Kenne Duncan as Abou, expedition headman
Emil Van Horn as Satan the gorilla (Van Horn also played the gorilla in Jungle Girl).

Production
Perils of Nyoka was budgeted at $169,296 although the final negative cost was $175,010 (a $5,714, or 3.4%, overspend), making it the most expensive Republic serial of 1942. It was filmed between March 20 and May 2, 1942, with the outdoor action sequences shot primarily at the Iverson Movie Ranch in Chatsworth, California.

The success of the original serial Jungle Girl prompted the sequel, but the studio did not want to pay licensing fees to Burroughs again, so it avoided any repetition of the term Jungle Girl, for which he owned the rights. Nyoka, the name of the main character in the first film, was instead placed in the title of the sequel, as that name was an original creation of Republic's writers, not of Burroughs. The word "jungle" was avoided in the film, with the setting described as an African "desert", though the area shown was not nearly as arid as is the Sahara.

Release

Theatrical
Perils of Nyoka'''s official release date was June 27, 1942, but that is actually the date upon which the seventh chapter was made available to film exchanges. The serial was re-released on April 2, 1952 under the new title Nyoka and the Tigermen, between the first runs of Radar Men from the Moon and Zombies of the Stratosphere.

TelevisionPerils of Nyoka was one of 26 Republic serials rereleased for television in 1966 under the Century 66 label. The title of the film was changed to Nyoka and the Lost Secrets of Hippocrates. This version was trimmed to 100 minutes in length.

Reception
Jim Harmon and Donald F. Glut have written that Perils of Nyoka was probably the best jungle-type serial ever made and that it "lavished in increased production values". Cline noted that Perils of Nyoka stood out in the memories of the original serial audiences, despite the strong competition of 1942.

Chapter titles
Desert Intrigue (26:50)
Death's Chariot (17:09)
Devil's Crucible (16:52)
Ascending Doom (16:48)
Fatal Second (16:49)
Human Sacrifice (16:41)
Monster's Clutch (16:47)
Tuareg Vengeance (16:44)
Buried Alive (16:41)
Treacherous Trail (16:51)
Unknown Peril (16:40)
Underground Tornado (16:39)
Thundering Death (16:43)
Blazing Barrier (16:38)
Satan's Fury (16:33)
Source:

See also
Jungle girl, character typeJungle Girl'' (1941), an earlier Nyoka serial
Damsel in distress
List of film serials
List of film serials by studio

References

External links

Jungle girls
Republic Pictures film serials
1942 films
1940s fantasy adventure films
American black-and-white films
1940s English-language films
Films based on works by Edgar Rice Burroughs
Films directed by William Witney
Films adapted into comics
American sequel films
American fantasy adventure films
Films with screenplays by Joseph F. Poland
1940s American films